Ram Soffer (born 6 September 1965) is an Israeli chess player. He was awarded the title Grandmaster by FIDE in 1994. Ram Soffer is also a grandmaster in chess problem solving since 1998.

He played on team Israel which won the 2016 European Senior Team Chess Championships in the 50+ division. Soffer also played for Israel in the 2017 World Senior Team Chess Championship, where his team finished fourth in the 50+ category.

Notes

External links
 
 

1965 births
Living people
Chess grandmasters
Israeli chess players
Jewish chess players
International solving grandmasters
Chess double grandmasters
Israeli Jews
Place of birth missing (living people)